The Dragon's Eye is the first book of Erec Rex, a series of children's books by American author Kaza Kingsley. It was first published by Firelight Press, an imprint of Simon and Schuster, in 2006.

References

External links 
 Official Site
 Firelight Press
 Simon & Schuster

Erec Rex
2006 American novels
2006 children's books